The Players Tour Championship 2011/2012 – Event 8 (also known as the 2011 Alex Higgins International Trophy) was a professional minor-ranking snooker tournament that took place between 20 and 23 October 2011 at the Killarney Convention Centre in Killarney, Republic of Ireland.

Neil Robertson won the ninth professional title of his career by defeating Judd Trump 4–1 in the final.

Prize fund and ranking points
The breakdown of prize money and ranking points of the event is shown below:

1 Only professional players can earn ranking points.

Main draw

Preliminary rounds

Round 1 
Best of 7 frames

Round 2 
Best of 7 frames

Main rounds

Top half

Section 1

Section 2

Section 3

Section 4

Bottom half

Section 5

Section 6

Section 7

Section 8

Finals

Century breaks 
Only from last 128 onwards. 

 142, 131  Ryan Day
 138, 135, 112  Judd Trump
 137, 112, 109, 109, 100  Neil Robertson
 137, 108, 103  Mark Selby
 135, 109  Stuart Bingham
 132, 110, 100  Martin Gould
 132  Simon Bedford
 130  Liu Song
 128  Liang Wenbo
 125, 110, 107, 107  Ricky Walden

 125  Ken Doherty
 123  Ali Carter
 117  Mark Joyce
 107  John Higgins
 105  Shaun Murphy
 105  Marco Fu
 102  Dave Harold
 101  Stephen Lee
 100  David Hogan
 100  Li Yan

References

External links 
 

08
2011 in Irish sport